The Lez is a  river in the Hérault department in southern France. It is the main river of the city of Montpellier. The river has its source in Saint-Clément-de-Rivière and flows into the Mediterranean Sea at Palavas-les-Flots. Its longest tributary is the Mosson.

The small fish Cottus petiti is endemic to a short stretch of this river.

References

Rivers of France
Rivers of Occitania (administrative region)
Rivers of Hérault
0Lez